Gaurena albifasciata is a moth in the family Drepanidae. It is found in India, Nepal and China (Yunnan, Tibet).

References

Moths described in 1931
Thyatirinae